The 2017 Maldives FA Cup is the 29th edition of the Maldives FA Cup.

Quarter finals

Semi finals

Third place match

Final

References
 FA Cup 2017 - Maldives at RSSSF

External links
 Maldives FA Cup Official page at Facebook
 FA Cup at Mihaaru Online

Maldives FA Cup seasons
FA Cup